The Indian rhinoceros (Rhinoceros unicornis), or Indian rhino for short, also known as the greater one-horned rhinoceros or great Indian rhinoceros, is a rhinoceros species native to the Indian subcontinent. Moreover, the extent and quality of the rhino's most important habitat, the alluvial Terai-Duar savanna and grasslands and riverine forest, is considered to be in decline due to human and livestock encroachment. As of August 2018, the global population was estimated to comprise 3,588 individuals, including 2,939 individuals in India and 649 in Nepal. Kaziranga National Park alone had an estimated population of 2,048 rhinos in 2009.

Indian rhinos once ranged throughout the entire stretch of the Indo-Gangetic Plain, but excessive hunting and agricultural development reduced its range drastically to 11 sites in northern India and southern Nepal. In the early 1990s, between 1,870 and 1,895 Indian rhinos were estimated to have been alive. Since then, numbers have increased due to conservation measures taken by the government. However, poaching remains a continuous threat, as more than 150 Indian rhinos were killed in Assam by poachers between 2000 and 2006.

Nearly 85% of the global Indian rhinoceros population is concentrated in Assam, where Kaziranga National Park contains 70% of rhino population.

Etymology 
The generic name Rhinoceros is a combination of the ancient Greek words ῥίς (ris) meaning "nose" and κέρας (keras) meaning "horn of an animal". The Latin word ūnicornis means "one-horned".

Taxonomy 
Rhinoceros unicornis was the scientific name used by Carl Linnaeus in 1758 who described a rhinoceros with one horn. As type locality, he indicated Africa and India.

The Indian rhinoceros is monotypic. Several specimens were described since the end of the 18th century under different scientific names, which are all considered synonyms of Rhinoceros unicornis today:

 R. indicus by Cuvier, 1817
 R. asiaticus by Blumenbach, 1830
 R. stenocephalus by Gray, 1867
 R. jamrachi by Sclater, 1876
 R. bengalensis by Kourist, 1970

Evolution 

Ancestral rhinoceroses first diverged from other perissodactyls in the Early Eocene. Mitochondrial DNA comparison suggests the ancestors of modern rhinos split from the ancestors of Equidae around 50 million years ago. The extant family, the Rhinocerotidae, first appeared in the Late Eocene in Eurasia, and the ancestors of the extant rhino species dispersed from Asia beginning in the Miocene.

Fossils of R. unicornis appear in the Middle Pleistocene. In the Pleistocene, the genus Rhinoceros ranged throughout South and Southeast Asia, with specimens located on Sri Lanka. Into the Holocene, some rhinoceros lived as far west as Gujarat and Pakistan until as recently as 3,200 years ago.

The Indian and Javan rhinoceroses, the only members of the genus Rhinoceros, first appear in the fossil record in Asia during the Early Pleistocene. The Indian rhinoceros is known from Early Pleistocene localities in Java, South China, India and Pakistan. Although belonging to the type genus, the Indian and Javan rhinoceroses are not believed to be closely related to other rhino species. Different studies have hypothesised that they may be closely related to the extinct Gaindatherium or Punjabitherium. A detailed cladistic analysis of the Rhinocerotidae placed Rhinoceros and the extinct Punjabitherium in a clade with Dicerorhinus, the Sumatran rhinoceros. Other studies have suggested the Sumatran rhinoceros is more closely related to the two African species. The Sumatran rhino may have diverged from the other Asian rhinos as long as 15 million years ago.

Characteristics 

Indian rhinos have a thick grey-brown skin with pinkish skin folds and one horn on their snout. Their upper legs and shoulders are covered in wart-like bumps. They have very little body hair, aside from eyelashes, ear fringes and tail brush. Bulls have huge neck folds. The skull is heavy with a basal length above  and an occiput above . In captive animals, the horn is frequently worn down to a thick knob.

The Indian rhino's single horn is present in both bulls and cows, but not on newborn calves. The horn is pure keratin, like human fingernails, and starts to show after about six years.

Among terrestrial land mammals native to Asia, Indian rhinos are second in size only to the Asian elephant. They are also the second-largest living rhinoceros, behind only the white rhinoceros.

The rich presence of blood vessels underneath the tissues in folds gives them the pinkish colour. The folds in the skin increase the surface area and help in regulating the body temperature. The thick skin does not protect against bloodsucking Tabanus flies, leeches and ticks.

Distribution and habitat

Indian rhinos once ranged across the entire northern part of the Indian subcontinent, along the Indus, Ganges and Brahmaputra River basins, from Pakistan to the Indian-Myanmar border, including Bangladesh and the southern parts of Nepal and Bhutan. They may have also occurred in Myanmar, southern China and Indochina. They inhabit the alluvial grasslands of the Terai and the Brahmaputra basin. As a result of habitat destruction and climatic changes its range has gradually been reduced so that by the 19th century, it only survived in the Terai grasslands of southern Nepal, northern Uttar Pradesh, northern Bihar, northern West Bengal, and in the Brahmaputra Valley of Assam.

The species was present in northern Bihar and Oudh at least until 1770 as indicated in maps produced by Colonel Gentil. On the former abundance of the species, Thomas C. Jerdon wrote in 1867:

Today, its range has further shrunk to a few pockets in southern Nepal, northern West Bengal, and the Brahmaputra Valley. Its habitat is surrounded by human-dominated landscapes, so that in many areas, it occurs in cultivated areas, pastures, and secondary forests. In the 1980s, Indian rhinos were frequently seen in the narrow plain area of Manas River and Royal Manas National Park in Bhutan.

Populations 

In 2006, the total Indian rhinoceros population was estimated to comprise 2,577 individuals, of which 2,165 lived in India:

 23 individuals in Uttar Pradesh, including 21 in Dudhwa National Park and 2 in Katarniaghat Wildlife Sanctuary
 135 individuals in West Bengal, including 108 in Jaldapara National Park and 27 in Gorumara National Park
 2,007 individuals in Assam, including 1,855 in Kaziranga National Park, 81 in Pobitora Wildlife Sanctuary, 68 in Orang National Park and 3 in Manas National Park.

By 2014, the population in Assam increased to 2,544 Indian rhinos, an increase of 27% since 2006, although more than 150 individuals were killed by poachers during these years.
The population in Kaziranga National Park was estimated at 2,048 individuals in 2009.

In 2015, Nepal had 645 Indian rhinos living in Parsa National Park, Chitwan National Park, Bardia National Park, Shuklaphanta Wildlife Reserve and respective buffer zones in the Terai Arc Landscape as recorded in a survey conducted from 11 April to 2 May 2015. The survey showed that the population of rhinos in Nepal from 2011 to 2015 increased 21% or 111 individuals.

The Indian rhino population, which once numbered as low as 100 individuals in the early 1900s, has increased to more than 3,700 in year 2021 as per The International Rhino Foundation (IRF) signature 2021 report, State of the Rhino.

Ecology and behaviour 

Bulls are usually solitary. Groups consist of cows with calves, or of up to six subadults. Such groups congregate at wallows and grazing areas. They are foremost active in early mornings, late afternoons and at night, but rest during hot days.
They bathe regularly. The folds in their skin trap water and hold it even when they exit wallows.

They have excellent senses of hearing and smell, but relatively poor eyesight. Over 10 distinct vocalisations have been recorded. Males have home ranges of around  that overlap each other. Dominant males tolerate other males passing through their territories except when they are in mating season, when dangerous fights break out.
Indian rhinos have few natural enemies, except for tigers, which sometimes kill unguarded calves, but adult rhinos are less vulnerable due to their size. Mynahs and egrets both eat invertebrates from the rhino's skin and around its feet. Tabanus flies, a type of horse-fly, are known to bite rhinos. The rhinos are also vulnerable to diseases spread by parasites such as leeches, ticks, and nematodes. Anthrax and the blood-disease sepsis are known to occur.
In March 2017, a group of four tigers consisting of an adult male, tigress and two cubs killed a 20-year-old male Indian rhinoceros in Dudhwa Tiger Reserve.

Diet 
Indian rhinos are grazers. Their diet consists almost entirely of grasses, but they also eat leaves, branches of shrubs and trees, fruits, and submerged and floating aquatic plants. 
They feed in the mornings and evenings. They use their semi-prehensile lips to grasp grass stems, bend the stem down, bite off the top, and then eat the grass. They tackle very tall grasses or saplings by walking over the plant, with legs on both sides and using the weight of their bodies to push the end of the plant down to the level of the mouth. Mothers also use this technique to make food edible for their calves. They drink for a minute or two at a time, often imbibing water filled with rhinoceros urine.

Social life 

Indian rhinos form a variety of social groupings. Bulls are generally solitary, except for mating and fighting. Cows are largely solitary when they are without calves. Mothers will stay close to their calves for up to four years after their birth, sometimes allowing an older calf to continue to accompany her once a newborn calf arrives. Subadult bulls and cows form consistent groupings, as well. Groups of two or three young bulls often form on the edge of the home ranges of dominant bulls, presumably for protection in numbers. Young cows are slightly less social than the bulls. Indian rhinos also form short-term groupings, particularly at forest wallows during the monsoon season and in grasslands during March and April. Groups of up to 10 rhinos, typically a dominant male with females and calves, gather in wallows.

Indian rhinos make a wide variety of vocalisations. At least 10 distinct vocalisations have been identified: snorting, honking, bleating, roaring, squeak-panting, moo-grunting, shrieking, groaning, rumbling and humphing. In addition to noises, the Indian rhino uses olfactory communication. Adult bulls urinate backwards, as far as  behind them, often in response to being disturbed by observers. Like all rhinos, the Indian rhinoceros often defecates near other large dung piles. The Indian rhino has pedal scent glands which are used to mark their presence at these rhino latrines. Bulls have been observed walking with their heads to the ground as if sniffing, presumably following the scent of cows.

In aggregations, Indian rhinos are often friendly. They will often greet each other by waving or bobbing their heads, mounting flanks, nuzzling noses, or licking. Indian rhinos will playfully spar, run around, and play with twigs in their mouths. Adult bulls are the primary instigators in fights. Fights between dominant bulls are the most common cause of rhino mortality, and bulls are also very aggressive toward cows during courtship. Bulls chase cows over long distances and even attack them face-to-face. Indian rhinos use their horns for fighting, albeit less frequently than African rhinos that largely use the incisors of the lower jaw to inflict wounds.

Reproduction 

Captive bulls breed at five years of age, but wild bulls attain dominance much later when they are larger. In one five-year field study, only one Indian rhino estimated to be younger than 15 years mated successfully. Captive cows breed as young as four years of age, but in the wild, they usually start breeding only when six years old, which likely indicates they need to be large enough to avoid being killed by aggressive bulls. Their gestation period is around 15.7 months, and birth interval ranges from 34 to 51 months.

In captivity, four Indian rhinos are known to have lived over 40 years, the oldest living to be 47.

Threats

Habitat degradation and floods 
Habitat degradation caused by human activities and climate change as well as the resulting increase in the floods has caused large death of Indian rhinos and has limited their ranging areas which is shrinking.

Serious declines in quality of habitat have occurred in some areas, due to:
 severe invasion by alien plants into grasslands affecting some populations;
 demonstrated reductions in the extent of grasslands and wetland habitats due to woodland encroachment and silting up of beels (swampy wetlands);
 grazing by domestic livestock.

Lack of site diversity 
The Indian rhino species is inherently at risk because over 70% of its population occurs at a single site, Kaziranga National Park. Any catastrophic event such as disease, civil disorder, poaching, or habitat loss would have a devastating impact on the Indian rhino's status. However, small population of rhinos may be prone to inbreeding depression. Expansion of other protective areas and introduction of rhinos in more areas is needed.

Poaching 

Sport hunting became common in the late 19th and early 20th centuries and was the main cause for the decline of Indian rhinoceros populations. Indian rhinos were hunted relentlessly and persistently. Reports from the mid-19th century claim that some British military officers shot more than 200 rhinos in Assam alone. By 1908, the population in Kaziranga National Park had decreased to around 12 individuals. In the early 1900s, the Indian rhinoceros was almost extinct. At present, poaching for the use of horn in traditional Chinese Medicine is one of the main threats that has led to decreases in several important populations. Poaching for the Indian rhino's horn became the single most important reason for the decline of the Indian rhinoceros after conservation measures were put in place from the beginning of the 20th century, when legal hunting ended. From 1980 to 1993, 692 rhinos were poached in India, including 41 rhinos in India's Laokhowa Wildlife Sanctuary in 1983, almost the entire population of the sanctuary. By the mid-1990s, the Indian rhinoceros had been extirpated in this sanctuary. Between 2000 and 2006, more than 150 rhinos were poached in Assam. Almost 100 rhinos were poached in India between 2013 and 2018.

When poor farmers from the mid-hills moved to the Chitwan Valley in search of arable land, the area was subsequently opened for settlement, and poaching of wildlife became rampant. The Chitwan population has repeatedly been jeopardised by poaching; in 2002 alone, poachers killed 37 animals to saw off and sell their valuable horns.

Six methods of killing Indian rhinos have been recorded:

 Shooting is by far the most common method used; rhino horn traders hire sharpshooters and often supply them with rifles and ammunition.
 Trapping in a pit depends largely on the terrain and availability of grass to cover it; pits are dug out in such a way that a fallen animal has little room to manoeuvre with its head slightly above the pit, so that it is easy to saw off the horn.
 Electrocution is used where high voltage powerlines pass through or near a protected area, to which poachers hook a long, insulated rod connected to a wire, which is suspended above a rhino path.
 Poisoning by smearing zinc phosphide rat poison or pesticides on salt licks frequented by rhinos is sometimes used.
 Spearing has only been recorded in Chitwan National Park.
 A noose, which cuts through the rhino's skin, kills it by strangulation.

Conservation 

Globally, Rhinoceros unicornis has been listed in CITES Appendix I since 1975. The Indian and Nepalese governments have taken major steps towards Indian rhinoceros conservation, especially with the help of the World Wide Fund for Nature (WWF) and other non-governmental organisations. In 1910, all rhino hunting in India became prohibited.

In 1957, the country's first conservation law ensured the protection of rhinos and their habitat. In 1959, Edward Pritchard Gee undertook a survey of the Chitwan Valley, and recommended the creation of a protected area north of the Rapti River and of a wildlife sanctuary south of the river for a trial period of 10 years. After his subsequent survey of Chitwan in 1963, he recommended extension of the sanctuary to the south. By the end of the 1960s, only 95 rhinos remained in the Chitwan Valley. The dramatic decline of the rhino population and the extent of poaching prompted the government to institute the Gaida Gasti – a rhino reconnaissance patrol of 130 armed men and a network of guard posts all over Chitwan. To ensure the survival of rhinos in case of epidemics, animals were translocated annually from Chitwan to Bardia National Park and Shuklaphanta National Park since 1986.
The Indian rhinoceros population living in Chitwan and Parsa National Parks was estimated at 608 mature individuals in 2015.

Reintroduction to new areas 
Indian rhinos have been reintroduced to the following new areas where they had previously inhabited but became extinct. These efforts have produced mixed results, mainly Due to lack of proper planning and management, sustained effort, adequate security of the introduced animals.

In 1984, five Indian rhinos were relocated to Dudhwa National Park — four from the fields outside the Pobitora Wildlife Sanctuary and one from Goalpara. This has born results and the population has increased to 21 rhinos by 2006.

In early 1980s, Laokhowa Wildlife Sanctuary in Assam had more than 70 Indian rhinos which were all killed by poachers. In 2016, two Indian rhinos, a mother and her daughter, were reintroduced to the sanctuary from Kaziranga National Park as part of the Indian Rhino Vision 2020 (IRV 2020) program, but both animals died within months due to natural causes.

Indian rhinos were once found as far west as the Peshawar Valley during the reign of Mughal Emperor Babur, but are now extinct in Pakistan. After rhinos became "regionally extinct" in Pakistan, two rhinos from Nepal were introduced in 1983 to Lal Suhanra National Park, which have not bred so far.

In captivity 

Indian rhinos were initially difficult to breed in captivity. In the second half of the 20th century, zoos became adept at breeding Indian rhinoceros. By 1983, nearly 40 babies had been born in captivity. As of 2012, 33 Indian rhinos were born at Switzerland's Zoo Basel alone, meaning that most captive animals are related to the Basel population. Due to the success of Zoo Basel's breeding program, the International Studbook for the species has been kept there since 1972. Since 1990, the Indian rhino European Endangered Species Programme is also being coordinated there, with the goal of maintaining genetic diversity in the global captive Indian rhinoceros population.

The first recorded captive birth of an Indian rhinoceros was in Kathmandu in 1826, but another successful birth did not occur for nearly 100 years. In 1925, a rhino was born in Kolkata. No rhinoceros was successfully bred in Europe until 1956 when first European breeding took place when baby rhino Rudra was born in Zoo Basel on 14 September 1956.

In June 2009, an Indian rhino was artificially inseminated using sperm collected four years previously and cryopreserved at the Cincinnati Zoo’s CryoBioBank before being thawed and used. She gave birth to a male calf in October 2010.

In June 2014, the first "successful" live-birth from an artificially inseminated rhino took place at the Buffalo Zoo in New York. As in Cincinnati, cryopreserved sperm was used to produce the female calf, Monica.

Cultural significance 
The Indian rhinoceros is one of the motifs on the Pashupati seal and many terracotta figurines that were excavated at archaeological sites of the Indus Valley civilisation. A rhinoceros is the vahana of the Hindu goddess Dhavdi. There is a temple dedicated to Maa (Mother) Dhavdi in Dhrangadhra, Gujarat.

The Rhinoceros Sutra is an early text in the Buddhist tradition, found in the Gandhāran Buddhist texts and the Pali Canon, as well as a version incorporated into the Sanskrit Mahavastu. It praises the solitary lifestyle and stoicism of the Indian rhinoceros and is associated with the eremitic lifestyle symbolized by the Pratyekabuddha.

Europe 

In the 3rd century, Philip the Arab exhibited an Indian rhinoceros in Rome. In 1515, Manuel I of Portugal obtained an Indian rhinoceros as a gift, which he passed on to Pope Leo X, but which died on the way from Lisbon to Rome. Three artistic representations were prepared of this rhinoceros: A woodcut by Hans Burgkmair, a drawing and a woodcut by Albrecht Dürer, all dated 1515. The Rhinoceros was sent as a present from the King of Portugal, Manuel I, to Pope Leo X in 1515, and this rhino died in a shipwreck off the coast of Italy in early 1516, and it was immortalised as Dürer's Rhinoceros in the woodcut. In 1577–1588, Abada was a female Indian rhinoceros kept by the Portuguese kings Sebastian I and Henry I from 1577 to 1580 and by Philip II of Spain from about 1580 to 1588. She was the first rhinoceros seen in Europe after Dürer's Rhinoceros. In about 1684, the first presumably Indian rhinoceros arrived in England. George Jeffreys, 1st Baron Jeffreys spread the rumour that his chief rival Francis North, 1st Baron Guilford had been seen riding on it.

In 1741–1758, Clara the rhinoceros (c. 1738 – 14 April 1758) was a female Indian rhinoceros who became famous during 17 years of touring Europe in the mid-18th century. She arrived in Europe in Rotterdam in 1741, becoming the fifth living rhinoceros to be seen in Europe in modern times since Dürer's Rhinoceros in 1515. After tours through towns in the Dutch Republic, the Holy Roman Empire, Switzerland, the Polish–Lithuanian Commonwealth, France, the Kingdom of the Two Sicilies, the Papal States, Bohemia and Denmark, she died in Lambeth, England. In 1739, she was drawn and engraved by two English artists. It was then brought to Amsterdam, where Jan Wandelaar made two engravings that were published in 1747. In the subsequent years, the rhinoceros was exhibited in several European cities. In 1748, Johann Elias Ridinger made an etching of it in Augsburg, and Petrus Camper modelled it in clay in Leiden. In 1749, Georges-Louis Leclerc, Comte de Buffon drew it in Paris. In 1751, Pietro Longhi painted it in Venice.

See also 

 Unicorn, mythological character
 The Soul of the Rhino

References

Further reading

External links

 
  
 
 Nepal Rhino Conservation
 TheBigZoo.com: Greater Indian Rhinoceros
 Indian Rhino page at AnimalInfo.org
 Indian Rhinoceros page at nature.ca
 Indian Rhinoceros page at UltimateUngulate.com
 
 

EDGE species
Fauna of Assam
Fauna of South Asia
Mammals described in 1758
Mammals of India
Mammals of Nepal
Rhinoceroses
Symbols of Assam
Taxa named by Carl Linnaeus
Vulnerable animals